Thomas Kennedy Macdonald (6 April 1847 – 17 October 1914), known as Kennedy Macdonald or Kennedy Mac, was a 19th-century Liberal Party Member of Parliament in Wellington, New Zealand.

Early life
Macdonald was born in Boulogne-sur-Mer in northern France. He came to Wellington from Australia in July 1871. Macdonald married Frances Rossiter on 15 November 1870 in Melbourne. They lost three sons within one month in 1876 during a scarlet fever epidemic.

He was a founding member of the New Zealand Academy of Fine Arts in 1882. Almost 100 years later, Inverlochy House, his former residence, was given to the academy.

Political career

MacDonald initially made political impact in local government. He served for seven years as Government representative on the Wellington Harbour Board including 2 years as its chairman. He was also a Wellington City Councillor from 1877 to 1878. In 1899 he stood unsuccessfully for Mayor of Wellington against John Aitken.

He represented the City of Wellington electorate from 1890 to 1891, when he resigned upon a bankruptcy claim. He was in favour of a land tax and of more (rural) roads, and of ending the jobbery in dealing in native land.

He considered standing in the Otaki by-election in January 1900, but the brother of the deceased incumbent consented to stand for the Liberal Party instead. He was later appointed to the Legislative Council from 1903 to 1911.

Death
Macdonald died on 17 October 1914 at the Porirua Lunatic Asylum where he had resided since November 1913. The Macdonald family is buried at Bolton Street Memorial Park, and their grave is part of the memorial trail.

McDonald Crescent in Wellington is named after him.

Notes

References

|- 

1847 births
1914 deaths
New Zealand Liberal Party MPs
Members of the New Zealand Legislative Council
New Zealand Liberal Party MLCs
Burials at Bolton Street Cemetery
New Zealand MPs for Wellington electorates
Members of the New Zealand House of Representatives
French emigrants to New Zealand
Unsuccessful candidates in the 1899 New Zealand general election
Wellington City Councillors
Wellington Harbour Board members
19th-century New Zealand politicians